The 2006 CEMAC Cup was the third edition of the CEMAC Cup, the football championship of Central African nations.

The tournament was held in the Equatorial Guinea.

First stage

Group A

Group B

Knockout stage
All matches in the knockout stage were played in Bata.

Semi-finals

3rd place playoff

Final

References
Details at RSSSF archives

CEMAC Cup
CEMAC
CEMAC
International association football competitions hosted by Equatorial Guinea
CEMAC